Events from the year 1526 in Ireland.

Incumbent
Lord: Henry VIII

Events

Births
 Edmund Tanner (d. 1579 in Ireland), Irish Jesuit, Roman Catholic Bishop of Cork and Cloyne, from 1574 to 1579.

Deaths
 Nicholas St Lawrence, 4th Baron Howth, Irish soldier and statesman of the early Tudor period.

References

1520s in Ireland
Ireland
Years of the 16th century in Ireland